Swimming at the 1984 Summer Paralympics consisted of 345 events.

Medal table

Participating nations

Medal summary

Men's events

Women's events

References 

 

1984 Summer Paralympics events
1984
Paralympics